Kjøpsvik Church is a parish church of the Church of Norway in Narvik Municipality in Nordland county, Norway. It is located in the village of Kjøpsvik. It is the church for the Kjøpsvik parish which is part of the Ofoten prosti (deanery) in the Diocese of Sør-Hålogaland. The white, concrete church was built in a long church style in 1975 using plans drawn up by the architect Nils Toft. The church seats about 400 people.

History
On 9 February 1601, a royal decree ordered the construction of the first church in Tysfjord. In 1791, the old church was taken down and moved to the nearby island of Hulløya. In 1839, the old church on Hulløya was taken down moved back to Kjøpsvik. In 1888, the old church was disassembled and moved to the village of Korsnes where it was rebuilt and it became known as Korsnes Church. A new church was built in Kjøpsvik to replace the old church that was taken down. By 1966, it was noted that old church was poorly maintained and it was difficult to heat during the winters, so a new building was seen as more economical that trying to fix up the old building. In 1975, the old church was torn down and a new church was built just to the west of the old church.

Media gallery

See also
List of churches in Sør-Hålogaland

References

Narvik
Churches in Nordland
20th-century Church of Norway church buildings
Churches completed in 1975
1601 establishments in Norway
Long churches in Norway
Concrete churches in Norway